The 2016 Wexford Senior Football Championship is the 118th edition of the Wexford GAA's premier club Gaelic football tournament for senior graded teams in County Wexford, Ireland. The tournament consists of 12 teams, with the winner going on to represent Wexford in the Leinster Senior Club Football Championship. The championship starts with a group stage and then progresses to a knock out stage.

St James' Ramsgrange were the defending champions after they defeated St. Martin's in the previous years final, however they relinquished their title to the same outfit at the Quarter-Final stage.

This was Glynn–Barntown's return to the senior grade after claiming the 2015 Wexford Intermediate Football Championship title.

Adamstown St Abban's were relegated back to the I.F.C. for 2017 after 20 years as a senior club with two S.F.C. final appearances in this period.

On 9 October 2016 Gusserane O'Rahillys claimed their 6th S.F.C. title when they defeated Glynn–Barntown on a scoreline of 0-11 to 0-10 at Wexford Park. This ended a 41-year wait for the club for S.F.C. honours.

Team changes 

The following teams have changed division since the 2015 championship season.

To S.F.C. 
Promoted from I.F.C.
 Glynn–Barntown – (Intermediate Champions)

From S.F.C. 
Relegated to I.F.C.
 St Fintan's

Group stage 
There are 2 groups called Group A and B. The top 4 in each group qualify for the Quarter Finals. The bottom finisher in each group will qualify for the Relegation Final.

Group A 

Round 1
 Castletown 2-12, 3-7 Glynn–Barntown, 8/4/2016,
 Horeswood 4-10, 2-13 Starlights, 23/4/2016,
 St James' 0-12, 1-7 St Anne's, 24/4/2016,

Round 2
 St Anne's 1-7, 0-9 Glynn–Barntown, 15/4/2016,
 Castletown 0-10, 0-9 Horeswood, 15/4/2016,
 St James' 3-6, 0-10 Starlights, 17/4/2016,

Round 3
 Glynn–Barntown 0-15, 0-9 Horeswood, 28/5/2016,
 Castletown 1-11, 0-8 St James', 4/6/2016,
 St Anne's 2-13, 1-8 Starlights, 4/6/2016,

Round 4
 Horeswood 1-5, 0-8 St James', 6/8/2016,
 Castletown 1-14, 0-9 St Anne's Rathangan,7/8/2016,
 Glynn–Barntown 2-10, 0-15 Starlights, 7/8/2016,

Round 5
 St Anne's 2-16, 1-4 Horeswood, 19/8/2016,
 Glynn–Barntown 1-11, 2-4 St James', 19/8/2016,
 Castletown 1-12, 1-6 Starlights, 20/8/2016,

Group B 

Round 1
 Shelmaliers 1-16, 1-5 Sarsfields, 8/4/2016,
 Gusserane 2-8, 1-8 Adamstown, 24/4/2016,
 St Martin's 0-10, 1-3 Fethard, 24/4/2016,

Round 2
 Shelmaliers 0-10, 0-9 Gusserane, 17/4/2016,
 Fethard 1-11, 3-4 Sarsfields, 17/4/2016,
 St Martin's 3-12, 0-6 Adamstown, 17/4/2016,

Round 3
 Fethard 3-7, 0-11 Adamstown, 28/5/2016,
 Gusserane 1-14, 1-6 Sarsfields, 31/5/2016,
 St Martin's 1-11, 0-11 Shelmaliers, 5/6/2016,

Round 4
 Shelmaliers 1-10, 0-8 Fethard, 6/8/2016,
 Sarsfields 2-7, 0-12 Adamstown, 7/8/2016,
 St Martin's 1-13, 0-5 Gusserane, 7/8/2016,

Round 5
 Shelmaliers 0-12, 1-9 Adamstown, 20/8/2016,
 St Martin's 4-21, 2-10 Sarsfields, 20/8/2016,
 Gusserane 1-11, 1-10 Fethard, 20/8/2016,

Knock-out Stages

Relegation Final 
The bottom finisher from both groups qualify for the Relegation final. The loser will be relegated to the 2017 Intermediate Championship.

 Starlights 3-10, 1-11 Adamstown, Enniscorthy, 2/9/2016,

Finals 
The top 4 teams from each group qualify for the Quarter-Finals with 1st -vs- 4th and 2nd -vs- 3rd in each case.

Quarter-Finals:

Semi-Finals:
 Gusserane O'Rahilly's 0-9, 0-6 Castletown Liam Mellows, Wexford Park, 25/9/2016, Report
 Glynn–Barntown 2-12, 0-9 St Martin's, Wexford Park, 25/9/2016, Report

Final:
 Gusserane O'Rahilly's 0-11, 0-10 Glynn–Barntown, Wexford Park, 9/10/2016,

Leinster Senior Club Football Championship

References 

Wexford Senior Football Championship
Wexford Senior Football Championship